Yeomchang-dong is a dong, neighbourhood of Gangseo-gu in Seoul, South Korea.

Name
The dong is named after a salt storage that originally existed in the region, which stored salt that was acquired in the western seas and transported through the Han river.

See also 
Administrative divisions of South Korea

References

External links
Gangseo-gu official website
 Gangseo-gu map at the Gangseo-gu official website
 Resident offices of Gangseo-gu

Neighbourhoods of Gangseo District, Seoul